Julia Richter may refer to:

 Julia Richter (actress) (born 1970), German actress
 Julia Richter (rower) (born 1988), German rower